The Mexico men's national 3x3 team, is controlled by the Asociación Deportiva Mexicana de Baloncesto ADEMEBA (Mexican Basketball Association) and represents Mexico in international 3x3 men's (3 against 3) basketball competitions.

Youth teams
Besides Mexico's senior national 3x3 team, the country features youth 3x3 national teams all the way down to the U12 level.

See also
Mexico national basketball team
Mexico women's national 3x3 team

References

External links
Official website
FIBA Profile

3x3
Men's national 3x3 basketball teams